Following is a table of United States presidential elections in Montana, ordered by year. Since its admission to statehood in 1889, Montana has participated in every U.S. presidential election.

Winners of the state are in bold. The shading refers to the state winner, and not the national winner.

See also
 Elections in Montana

Notes

References